Santa Cruz is a district of the Santa Cruz canton, in the Guanacaste province of Costa Rica.

Geography 
Santa Cruz has an area of  km² and an elevation of  metres.

Villages
Administrative center of the district is the town of Santa Cruz.

Other villages in the district are Ángeles, Arado, Bernabela, Cacao, Cinto, Conga, Cuatro Esquinas, Chibola, Chircó, Chumico, Guayabal, Hato Viejo, Lagunilla, Lechuza, Limón, Moya, Puente Negro. Retallano (partly), Rincón, Río Caño Viejo, San Juan, San Pedro and Vistamar.

Demographics 

For the 2011 census, Santa Cruz had a population of  inhabitants.

Transportation

Road transportation 
The district is covered by the following road routes:
 National Route 21
 National Route 160
 National Route 904
 National Route 909
 National Route 931

References 

Districts of Guanacaste Province
Populated places in Guanacaste Province